Thala pembaensis is a species of small sea snail, marine gastropod mollusk in the family Costellariidae, the ribbed miters.

Description

Distribution
This marine species occurs off Mozambique.

References

 Herrmann M. & Gori S. (2012) Two new species of Mitromica and Thala (Gastropoda: Costellariidae) from Oman and Mozambique. Conchylia 42(1-4): 39-47.

Costellariidae
Gastropods described in 2012